Jillian Rose Blois (born 1974) is a Canadian retired rower. She was a World champion in the lightweight fours.

References

Living people
Date of birth missing (living people)
Canadian female rowers
World Rowing Championships medalists for Canada
1974 births
20th-century Canadian women